Range Law is a 1944 American Western film directed by Lambert Hillyer. This is the ninth film in the "Marshal Nevada Jack McKenzie" series, and stars Johnny Mack Brown as Jack McKenzie and Raymond Hatton as his sidekick Sandy Hopkins, with Sarah Padden, Ellen Hall and Lloyd Ingraham.

Main cast
Johnny Mack Brown as U. S. Marshal Nevada McKenzie  
Raymond Hatton as U. S. Marshal Sandy Hopkins  
Sarah Padden as Boots Annie  
Ellen Hall as Lucille Gray  
Lloyd Ingraham as Judge Cal Bowen  
Marshall Reed as Jim Bowen  
Jack Ingram as Phil Randall  
Art Fowler as Henchman Swede Larson  
Hugh Prosser as Sheriff Jed Hawkins  
Stanley Price as Dawson  
Steve Clark as Pop McGee

References

Bibliography
Monaco, James. The Encyclopedia of Film. Perigee Books, 1991.

External links

1944 films
1944 Western (genre) films
American Western (genre) films
Films directed by Lambert Hillyer
Monogram Pictures films
American black-and-white films
1940s American films